Grevillea calcicola is a species of flowering plant in the family Proteaceae and is endemic to the north-west of Western Australia. It is a much-branched shrub with pinnatisect leaves with linear lobes, and off-white to cream-coloured flowers.

Description

Taxonomy
Grevillea calcicola was first formally described in 1968 by Alex George in the Journal of the Royal Society of Western Australia from specimens he collected in the Cape Range National Park in 1961. The specific epithet (calcicola) means "limestone-dweller".

Distribution and habitat
This grevillea grows in low mallee shrubland in rocky or stony limestone soils and is restricted to the Cape Range west of Exmouth in north-western Western Australia.

Conservation status
Grevillea calcicola is listed as  "Priority Three" by the Government of Western Australia Department of Biodiversity, Conservation and Attractions, meaning that it is poorly known and known from only a few locations but is not under imminent threat.

See also
 List of Grevillea species

References

calcicola
Proteales of Australia
Eudicots of Western Australia
Taxa named by Alex George
Plants described in 1967